William Ridding (23 November 1830 – 1 May 1900) was an English cleric and cricketer. He was a right-handed batsman who played primarily as a wicketkeeper.

Life
The son of Charles Henry Ridding, he was educated at Winchester College, where he represented the college cricket team, and New College, Oxford, where he matriculated in 1848 and graduated M.A. in 1856. He became vicar of Meriden, then in Warwickshire.

Ridding died at Upper Clapton, County of London on 1 May 1900.

Cricketer
Ridding made his first-class debut for Oxford University against the Marylebone Cricket Club in 1849. From 1849 to 1853, he played for the University 10 times, with his final first-class appearance for the university coming against the Marylebone Cricket Club in 1853. In his 10 first-class matches for the university, Ridding scored 268 runs at a batting average of 20.61, with two half centuries and highest score of 53.

In 1849, he made his debut for the Marylebone Cricket Club against Sussex. In 1851, he played his second and final first-class match for the club against Sussex.

Ridding represented Hampshire in a single first-class match against the Marylebone Cricket Club in 1861. As well as play for the above teams, he also represented the Gentlemen of England, and the Gentlemen in the 1849 and 1850 Gentlemen v Players matches. Ridding also played a number of non first-class matches for Oxfordshire.

In his overall first-class career he scored 326 runs at an average of 15.52, with two half centuries and a highest score of 53. Behind the stumps he took 9 catches and made 17 stumpings.

Family
Ridding's brothers, Charles Ridding and Arthur Ridding both played first-class cricket. Another brother, George Ridding, was a headmaster and first Bishop of Southwell.

Ridding married in 1858 Caroline Selina Caldecott, daughter of Charles M. Caldecott of Holbrook Grange, Warwickshire. Their daughter Mary Ridding became a Sanskrit and Pali scholar and translated Banabhatta's Kadambari into English.

References

External links
William Ridding at Cricinfo
William Ridding at CricketArchive
Matches and detailed statistics for William Ridding

1830 births
1900 deaths
Cricketers from Winchester
People educated at Winchester College
Alumni of New College, Oxford
English cricketers
Oxford University cricketers
Gentlemen cricketers
Marylebone Cricket Club cricketers
Gentlemen of England cricketers
Hampshire cricketers
English cricketers of 1826 to 1863